Jonathan Mulia (born July 8, 1986 in Jakarta, Indonesia) is an Indonesian actor. He began with the widely recognized role as young Soe Hok Gie in film Gie. He is the younger brother of Onky Alexander.

Personal life
Jonathan has also been rumored as being gay and had a relationship with singer Afgansyah Reza.

Filmography

Film
 Gie (2005)
 Mirror (2005)
 Karma (2008)

References

External links
 
 Profil

Indonesian male film actors
Indonesian people of Chinese descent
1986 births
People from Jakarta
Living people